Yashpal Singh Kalsi (born 23 September 1978) is a martial artist from Delhi. He has been characterised as 'the pioneer of the self-defence industry in India'.

Black Belt

Early life
Yashpal Singh Kalsi was born 23 September 1978 in Delhi to Sikh parents Ram Singh Kalsi and his wife Anamika Singh Kalsi. He took up karate at the age of 8 and soon became captain of his school karate team. He is a karate black belt. He received his first black belt in 1996 and since then he has won medals at state, national and International Karate Championships.

Country representation and lineage 
Started training as a coach at Indian Martial Arts Academy in 1996, under the guidance of Shihan A. B. George.

1999, extended services to All India Martial Art Federation and Martial Art Association of Delhi.

2001, Started working under India’s well-known maser Shihan Dr. Moses Thilak, who was a direct lineage of master Kenei Mabuni.

2004, Soke Yuriy Kostrov, Grandmaster of Agni Kenpo appointed Yashpal Singh as the representative of Kenpo Karate in India.

After Mr. Thilak’s demise. in 2004, Mr Kalsi perused Itosu Kai karate under Grandmaster Saadaki Sakagami from Japan.

In 2006 Shihan Akira Sato and Soke Seiko Suzuki from Japan appointed Mr. Singh, as country administrator of Seiko Kai Asia.

2007, Soke Tamas Weber appointed Yashpal Singh Kalsi as Chief of Sanshinkan Karate in South Asia till now.

Coaching career

Yashpal Singh Kalsi, is founding member of All India Mixed Martial Arts Federation, and as of 2015 was the head of the Delhi branch India Mixed Martial Arts Association.

Singh Kalsi is a WKF certified Karate and Mixed Martial Arts trainer and has students from India, Greece, U.S.A, Chile, Malaysia, South Africa, Afghanistan, Pakistan, Nepal, the UK, and many other places. He is also qualified in Brazilian jiu-jitsu. His students have represented India in international tournaments and world championships. Since 2007, he has been chief trainer at Sanshinkan International, a Swedish martial arts school based in Gurgaon, and heads its centres across India. The chain trains both men and women; Singh Kalsi works alongside his wife, Anamika Singh Kalsi.

Karate 
Singh Kalsi is a WKF (world Karate Federation) certified Karate coach. Holds Black Belt 6th Dan from World Karate Federation and 7th Dan from Sanshinkan International. He has trained the top players from India, Since 2007, These players still are representing in the world  and International championships. Mr. Singh was appointed as official coach of the National Karate Team in the following international championships.

2011 - Karate World Cup Malaysia

2013 – Youth Cup, Croatia

2016 – US Open, Las Vegas

2017 – US Open, Las Vegas

2018 – US Open, Las Vegas

Mixed martial arts 
Yashpal Singh Kalsi, is founding member of All India Mixed Martial Arts Federation and Global Authority of Mixed Martial Arts Federations. He is a trained and qualified international MMA referee by, International Mixed Martial Arts Federation

As of 2015 was the head of the Delhi branch India Mixed Martial Arts Association. He trains Mixed Martial Arts.  He is a head coach to some of the best MMA fighters from India Seth Rosario, Priyanka Jeet Toshi, Lipika Uniyal and Sandeep Yadav.

He is also a MMA judge and senior referee in the Super Fight League.

He has provided training to India's elite force, the Black Cat Commandos, and continuously works with the State Police.

Grappling 
Mr. Kalsi was the first official coach of Grappling Federation of India. He trained the Indian athletes for the Grappling world cup at Moscow for Cadet Veteran and Junior august 2015. Our Junior team won 2nd place.

2016 Mr. Kalsi was a referee in the World Grappling championship at Minsk.

Self defense 
Yashpal Singh is well known for his expertise in self defense. He has trained and empow\ered more than 100,000 Indian women. Yashpal Singh’s wife Anamika is a Black belt 6th Dan she work along with him. The couple are authors of the first book ever written on self defense in India ‘'Self Defense and You''.

First Indian karate coach to train in Africa, Europe and Canada 
Singh is the first Indian to get invited in 2011 and train in South Africa.

Yashpal Singh Kalsi also trained in some parts of Europe and interviewed in radio and magazines.

In 2018, Just after winning the US Open Karate Championship he was invited to Canada by Shihan Akira Sato for the exchange program.

Awards and recognition
Yashpal won a medal for India in the Swedish Open Karate Championship in 2013. He won a gold medal in the US Open Karate Championship in 2016. He won two bronze medals in the US Open Karate Championship in 2017.

Year 2018 Yashpal Singh Kalsi won gold medal in US open along with his wife Anamika Singh Kalsi.

References 

1978 births
Martial arts trainers
Martial arts champions
Living people